Anthony G. DiFalco (born July 14, 1938) is an American politician who served in the New York State Assembly from 1969 to 1976.

References

1938 births
Living people
Democratic Party members of the New York State Assembly